Swingtime Johnny is a 1944 American comedy musical film directed by Edward F. Cline and starring Patty Andrews, Maxene Andrews and Laverne Andrews.

Plot
A factory that manufactures pipe organs is converted into a munitions supplier for the war effort. While celebrating the firm's 50th anniversary at a nightclub, Jonathan Chadwick, the company's president, makes a spectacle of himself over underdressed performer Linda Lane, unaware that her striptease is a part of her act.

Linda ends up landing a job as Jonathan's secretary at the plant. She also discovers that a rival company about to purchase the entire enterprise from Jonathan is defrauding him, falsely claiming that the plant's shell casings are defective. Linda intends to leave for New York to resume her singing career until Jonathan persuades her to stay.

Cast

See also
 List of American films of 1944

References

External links
Swingtime Johnny at TCMDB
Swingtime Johnny at IMDb

American musical films
1944 films
1944 musical films
American black-and-white films
1940s American films